The 1937 Morgan Bears football team was an American football team that represented Morgan College in the Colored Intercollegiate Athletic Association (CIAA) during the 1937 college football season. In their ninth season under head coach Edward P. Hurt, the Bears compiled a 7–0 record, won the CIAA championship, shut out five of seven opponents, and outscored all opponents by a total of 168 to 19. The Bears were recognized as the 1937 black college national champion.

The school's newly constructed stadium was formally opened on October 17, 1937, in a dedication ceremony prior to the football game against .

Schedule

References

Morgan
Morgan State Bears football seasons
Black college football national champions
College football undefeated seasons
Morgan Bears football